Yeniköy is a village in the Besni District, Adıyaman Province, Turkey. Its population is 463 (2021).

The hamlets of Aşağı Erler, Yukarı Erler and Zonmağara are attached to  the village.

References

Villages in Besni District